Blue Bloods is an American police procedural television series created by Robin Green and Mitchell Burgess. It premiered on September 24, 2010 on CBS. The series centers on the Reagans, a family of police officers in New York City. Frank Reagan (Tom Selleck) is the police commissioner with three grown children working in law enforcement: the oldest, Danny (Donnie Wahlberg), a pragmatic detective; Erin (Bridget Moynahan), an assistant district attorney who prosecutes many of the offenders Danny apprehends; and Jamie (Will Estes), a Harvard Law School graduate and a patrol cop in the NYPD. Frank's second son, Joseph, an NYPD detective, was killed in the line of duty while investigating a group of dirty cops nicknamed "The Blue Templar."

Series overview

Episodes

Season 1 (2010–11)

Season 2 (2011–12)

Season 3 (2012–13)

Season 4 (2013–14)

Season 5 (2014–15)

Season 6 (2015–16)

Season 7 (2016–17)

Season 8 (2017–18)

Season 9 (2018–19)

Season 10 (2019–20)

Season 11 (2020–21)

Season 12 (2021–22)

Season 13 (2022–23)

Home video releases

References

External links 

Episodes
Blue Bloods